Chantilly is a census-designated place (CDP) in western Fairfax County, Virginia. The population was 24,301 as of the 2020 census. Chantilly is named after an early-19th-century mansion and farm, which in turn took the name of an 18th-century plantation that was located in Westmoreland County, Virginia. The name "Chantilly" originated in France with the Château de Chantilly, about 28 miles north of Paris.

It is located between Centreville to the south, Herndon and Reston to the north and northeast, respectively, and Fairfax  to the southeast. U.S. Route 50 and Virginia State Route 28 intersect in Chantilly, and these highways provide access to the Dulles/Reston/Tysons Corner technology corridor and other major employment centers in Northern Virginia and Washington, D.C.

History

Chantilly was home to a number of colonial plantations in the 1700s, including the Sully Plantation (now the Sully Historic Site) built by Richard Bland Lee I. Other plantations included George Richard Lee Turberville's "Leeton Grove" (originally a 5,000+ acre plantation, the main house of which still stands at 4619 Walney Rd.), the John Hutchison Farm, and the Chantilly Plantation, after which Chantilly is named. Cornelia Lee Turberville Stuart, who was born at Leeton and was the daughter of George Richard Lee Turberville and Henrietta Lee, inherited a portion of Leeton in 1817 from her father. Stuart and her husband Charles Calvert Stuart, whom she had married in 1816, constructed the Chantilly Plantation and named it after the Westmoreland County plantation owned by her grandfather, Richard Henry Lee, a signer of the Declaration of Independence. During the Civil War, federal troops destroyed by fire the Chantilly Plantation manor house. One building remains, a stone house across Route 50 from the Greenbriar Shopping Center. While it is not clear what this stone house was used for, most historical evidence suggests it was probably a plantation overseer's quarters during the antebellum period, and a tavern or boarding house following the war. After the war, Cornelia Stuart, who had become deeply in debt, sold her  Chantilly estate. The advertisement for the sale referenced several "tenements", one of which was the Stone House.

The village grew during the 19th century, particularly following the construction of the Little River Turnpike to Winchester.

The evolution of the Chantilly area into an outer suburb of Washington, D.C., gained momentum after 1980, as developers built residential subdivisions and commercial areas, filling in the farmland south of Dulles Airport.

Civil War

During the American Civil War on September 1, 1862, the Battle of Chantilly (or Ox Hill) was fought nearby. Following his victory at the Second Battle of Bull Run (or Second Manassas), Confederate General Robert E. Lee directed Major General Thomas J. "Stonewall" Jackson to cross Bull Run on August 31 and sweep around the position of Major General John Pope's Union Army of Virginia at Centreville. Reaching the Little River Turnpike (now U.S. Route 50) northwest of Centreville, Jackson turned southeastward toward Fairfax Court House (now the city of Fairfax) to strike in rear of Pope's army.

During September 1, Pope, apprised of Jackson's movement, began to withdraw toward Fairfax Court House. Late in the day, Jackson clashed with Union forces under Brigadier General Isaac Stevens and Major General Philip Kearny near Ox Hill, west of Fairfax. During the ensuing battle, which was fought amid a raging storm, both Union generals Stevens and Kearny were killed. The fighting ended at dusk, and Pope's army continued its withdrawal to Fairfax and subsequently to the Washington defenses.

Although commercial and residential development now covers most of the Chantilly (Ox Hill) battlefield, the small Ox Hill Battlefield Park preserves a  portion of the battle site.

Geography
Chantilly is located in western Fairfax County at  (38.894146, −77.431407). It is bordered to the west by the South Riding CDP in Loudoun County, to the north by Washington Dulles International Airport, to the northeast by the Franklin Farm CDP, to the east by the Greenbriar CDP, and to the south by Centreville. To the southwest is Schneider Crossroads, not part of any census-designated area.

The present center of Chantilly is located around the intersection of U.S. Route 50 (Lee Jackson Memorial Highway) and Virginia Route 28 (Sully Road).

Governance
Chantilly is part of Sully District in Fairfax County and is governed by the Fairfax County Board of Supervisors. The current supervisor for Sully District is Kathy Smith.

Demographics

As of the census of 2010, there were 23,039 people, 7,218 households, and 5,939 families residing in the CDP. The population density was 1,916.7 people per square mile (740.1/km2). There were 7,403 housing units at an average density of 615.9/sq mi (237.8/km2). The racial makeup of the CDP was 57.6% White, 6.5% African American, 0.3% Native American, 25.2% Asian, 0.1% Pacific Islander, 6.1% some other race, and 4.3% from two or more races. Hispanic or Latino of any race were 15.9% of the population.

There were 7,218 households, out of which 47.8% had children under the age of 18 living with them, 67.0% were headed by married couples living together, 10.6% had a female householder with no husband present, and 17.7% were non-families. Of all households 13.0% were made up of individuals, and 2.4% were someone living alone who was 65 years of age or older. The average household size was 3.19, and the average family size was 3.46.

In the CDP the population was spread out, with 27.8% under the age of 18, 7.8% from 18 to 24, 28.6% from 25 to 44, 29.3% from 45 to 64, and 6.5% who were 65 years of age or older. The median age was 36.1 years. For every 100 females there were 100.2 males. For every 100 females age 18 and over, there were 98.7 males.

For the period 2010 through 2014, the estimated median annual income for a household in the CDP was $118,991, and the median income for a family was $130,280. Male full-time workers had a median income of $81,596 versus $62,228 for females. The per capita income for the CDP was $46,341. About 7.5% of families and 8.9% of the population were below the poverty line, including 14.3% of those under age 18 and 6.2% of those age 65 or over.

Economy
The American Registry for Internet Numbers is headquartered adjacent to Washington Dulles International Airport, near Chantilly.

At one time, Compass Airlines was headquartered near Chantilly. The headquarters was relocated to Minnesota in late 2009.

Notable local organizations

 Ellanor C. Lawrence Park – Along Route 28 between Chantilly and Centreville, the park grounds include the historic farmhouse and mill, trails, fitness stations, and athletic fields. Coyote sightings have been reported within the park.
 Flat Lick Stream Valley Park
 The Steven F. Udvar-Hazy Center annex of the National Air and Space Museum
 The headquarters of the National Reconnaissance Office (NRO), which is one of the 17 U.S. intelligence agencies and considered, along with the Central Intelligence Agency (CIA), National Security Agency (NSA), Defense Intelligence Agency (DIA), and National Geospatial‐Intelligence Agency (NGA), to be one of the "big five" U.S. Intelligence agencies. It designs, builds, and operates the spy satellites of the United States government, and provides satellite intelligence to several government agencies, particularly signals intelligence (SIGINT) to the NSA, imagery intelligence (IMINT) to the NGA, and measurement and signature intelligence (MASINT) to the DIA.
 The Westfields Marriott in Chantilly hosted the annual Bilderberg summit in 2002, 2008, 2012, and 2017, which inspired protests.

Education

Primary and secondary schools
Residents of the CDP go to Fairfax County Public Schools.

Elementary schools within the CDP include Brookfield Elementary School, Greenbriar East Elementary School, Greenbriar West Elementary School, Lees Corner Elementary School, Navy Elementary School, and Poplar Tree Elementary School.

Rocky Run Middle School, Franklin Middle School, and Chantilly High School are located within the CDP. Westfield High School is a large high school located outside of the CDP.

St. Timothy School and St. Veronica School, private Catholic schools, are located in the CDP.

Public libraries
Fairfax County Public Library operates the Chantilly Regional Library in the CDP.

Media
Chantilly is served by The CentreView newspaper.

Notable people
Chris Beatty, American football coach
Chuck Caputo, Virginia House of Delegates
Kaye Dacus, author
Phil Hubbard, former professional basketball player
Bhawoh Jue, former professional American football player
Joe Koshansky, professional baseball player
Alessandra Marc, dramatic soprano
Jimmy Martin, former professional American football player
Cameron Nizialek, professional American football player
Eddie Royal, former professional American football player
Evan Royster, former professional American football player

See also
 Mitchell-Weeks House, log cabin with historic marker
 Willard, Virginia, adjacent town displaced for construction of Dulles Airport

References

External links

 Chantilly High School
 Chantilly Regional Library
 Dulles South area community portal serving Chantilly and South Riding
 Census Tract Outline Map—Fairfax County

Census-designated places in Fairfax County, Virginia
Census-designated places in Virginia